is a Japanese model, actress, and singer. She is currently under contract with the talent agency IS Field.

Career

Modeling career
Sugimoto began her career in modeling during elementary school, when she was chosen in a Grand-Prix semi-audition for the girls manga magazine Ribon.

Acting career
In July 2007 she received her first lead role in TV Tokyo's late TV drama series Boys Esté. Her latest role is Miu Sutō/Go-on Silver in the 2008 TV Asahi's tokusatsu series Engine Sentai Go-onger. She stars also in Mutant Girls Squad under the direction from Tak Sakaguchi, Noburu Iguchi and Yoshihiro Nishimura.

Music career
Aside from singing character portrayal songs in Engine Sentai Go-onger, Sugimoto has expressed an interest in producing music. She released her debut single, "Harukoi", composed by Tomosuke Funaki, on February 17, 2010.

Personal life

Sugimoto married a non-celebrity man in 2016, but they divorced in July 2019.

Filmography

Film

TV drama

Mobile drama

Web drama

Anime

Stage
 Nakano Blondys Musical (12–20 March 2008, Space Zero)

DVD
 Yumi Sugimoto -Flowering- (Released May 2006)
 Yumi Sugimoto -Morning Star- (Released January 2007)
 Yumi Sugimoto -Journey Hitori Sugimoto Yumi 19-year-old- (Released September 2008)

Discography
  (released February 17, 2010)

References

External links
 
 
Personal blog  (January 1st 2018 to )

1989 births
Living people
Japanese actresses
Japanese television personalities
Japanese gravure models
Japanese female models